Juliano Augusto Fernandes  (born 24 October 1959) is a Bissau-Guinean lawyer, university professor, and politician.

References

Living people
1959 births
Bissau-Guinean politicians
Interior ministers of Guinea-Bissau
Bissau-Guinean lawyers
University of Lisbon alumni